Jonathan Lewellen is an American economist, currently the Carl E. and Catherine M. Heidt Professor of Finance at Dartmouth College and formerly the Jon D. Gruber Career Development Chair at Sloan School of Management.

References

Year of birth missing (living people)
Living people
Dartmouth College faculty
American economists
University of Rochester alumni
Indiana University alumni